The 1930 California Golden Bears football team was an American football team that represented the University of California, Berkeley during the 1930 college football season. Under head coach Nibs Price, the team compiled an overall record of 4–5 and 1–4 in conference.

Schedule

References

California
California Golden Bears football seasons
California Golden Bears football